Noah Martin (July 26, 1801May 28, 1863) was a New Hampshire businessman and politician who served as the 23rd governor of New Hampshire from 1852 to 1854.

Biography
Noah Anthony Martin was born in Epsom, New Hampshire on July 26, 1801, the son of shoemaker Samuel Martin and Sally (Cochrane) Martin.  He apprenticed under Pembroke and Deerfield doctors before attending Dartmouth Medical College.  He graduated in 1824, and began his medical practice in Somersworth.  He later practiced in Pembroke, and then settled in Dover.

In 1825, Martin married Mary Jane Woodbury, the daughter of Dr. Robert Woodbury of Barrington.  They were the parents of two daughters, Elizabeth A. and Caroline M.

Martin served as a State Representative in 1830 and 1832, as a State Senator in 1835 and 1836, and in the House again in 1837.

In addition to being involved in several medical, agricultural, historical, and genealogical societies, Martin was president of the Strafford County Savings Bank (1844–1852), board of directors member of the Dover Bank (1847–1855), and board of directors member of the Strafford Bank (1860–1863).

In 1852 Martin was elected Governor of New Hampshire, the first of two from Dover, and he served two one-year terms, June 3, 1852 to June 8, 1854.

Martin died in Dover on May 28, 1863, and is buried at Dover's Pine Hill Cemetery.

References
Noah Martin at National Governors Association
Noah Martin at Epsom Historical Association

External links
A Guide to Likenesses of New Hampshire Officials and Governors  – Noah Martin
Dover Public Library – Governor Noah Martin House

1801 births
1863 deaths
People from Epsom, New Hampshire
People from Dover, New Hampshire
Democratic Party governors of New Hampshire
Geisel School of Medicine alumni
Democratic Party members of the New Hampshire House of Representatives
Democratic Party New Hampshire state senators
Burials in New Hampshire
19th-century American politicians